Santiago Malano (born 29 January 1987) is an Argentinian footballer. His last club was Malta's Valletta F.C.

External links
 
 

1987 births
Valletta F.C. players
Maltese Premier League players
Expatriate footballers in Malta
Living people
People from Mercedes, Buenos Aires
Argentine footballers
Argentine expatriate footballers
Atlético de Rafaela footballers
Racing Club de Avellaneda footballers
Audax Italiano footballers
Cúcuta Deportivo footballers
Deportes Temuco footballers
Argentine Primera División players
Chilean Primera División players
Primera B de Chile players
Categoría Primera A players
Expatriate footballers in Chile
Expatriate footballers in Colombia
Association football forwards
Sportspeople from Buenos Aires Province